Bulbophyllum macrorhopalon is a species of Bulbophyllum found in Asia.

Description

Plant blooms in the fall with a single 1.8 cm wide flower.

References
The Bulbophyllum-Checklist
The Internet Orchid Species Photo Encyclopedia

macrorhopalon